Oscillospiraceae is a family of bacteria in the class Clostridia. All Oscillospiraceae are obligate anaerobes. However, members of the family have diverse shapes, with some rod-shaped and others cocci.

Within the family, Faecalibacterium prausnitzii is notable as an abundant commensal bacteria of the human gut microbiota. In addition, several members of Ruminococcus are found in the human gut.

References 

Eubacteriales
Bacteria families